Bruno Campanella (born January 6, 1943, Bari) is an Italian conductor and a distinguished interpreter of the Italian Opera.

He studied composition under Nino Rota and Luigi Dallapiccola. He had Hans Swarowsky and Thomas Schippers as instructors in conducting.

Since the late 1970s he has been known worldwide as a specialist in Bel Canto. However, his repertoire also includes works by Maurice Ravel, Igor Stravinsky, and Giuseppe Verdi, among others.

He performs at such major theaters as La Scala in Milan, the Metropolitan Opera of NYC, the San Francisco Opera, the Houston Grand Opera, the Lyric Opera of Chicago, L’Opéra de Montréal, L’Opéra National de Paris, the Wiener Staatsoper, the Royal Opera House in London, the Gran Teatre del Liceu in Barcelona, the Municipal Theatre of Santiago, the New National Theatre of Tokyo.

He served as principal conductor at the Teatro Regio di Torino from 1992 to 1995. At present he is Teatro Regio's principal guest conductor.

In 2002 the French Ministry of Culture awarded him the title of Officier de l’Ordre des Arts et des Lettres.

Discography
Among his recordings:
Bel Canto Arias, with Kathleen Battle (CD Deutsche Grammophon, 1993).
Don Pasquale, with Enzo Dara and Luciana Serra (CD Nuova Era, 1988).
Il Barbiere di Siviglia, with Rockwell Blake and Luciana Serra (CD Nuova Era, 1987).
La Cenerentola, with Cecilia Bartoli and Enzo Dara (DVD Decca Records, 1996).
La Fille du Régiment, with June Anderson and Alfredo Kraus (CD EMI, 1986).
La Fille du Régiment, with Natalie Dessay and Juan Diego Flórez (DVD Virgin Classics, 2007).
L'ajo nell'imbarazzo, with Enzo Dara and Luciana Serra (CD Fonit Cetra, Warner Music Group, 1994).
La traviata, with Renato Bruson, Mariella Devia and Giuseppe Filianoti (DVD La Voce, Inc., 2006).
L'italiana in Algeri, with Jennifer Larmore, Bruce Ford and Simone Alaimo (DVD TDK Music, 2007).
Macbeth, with Carlos Àlvarez, Maria Guleghina and Roberto Scandiuzzi (DVD Opus Arte, 2005).
Norma, with Fiorenza Cedolins, Vincenzo La Scola and Nidia Palacios (DVD La Voce, Inc., 2004).

References

Bruno Campanella, biography - Stagedoor
Biographies - Who's Who in Italy

Italian male conductors (music)
1943 births
Living people
People from Bari
Officiers of the Ordre des Arts et des Lettres
21st-century Italian conductors (music)
21st-century Italian male musicians